The 1926–27 season was the 50th Scottish football season in which Dumbarton competed at national level, entering the Scottish Football League and the Scottish Cup. In addition Dumbarton played in the Dumbartonshire Cup.

Scottish League

Dumbarton's fifth successive season in the Second Division saw a further decline in performances, and with 5 defeats coming in their first 7 games it was clear that the team would struggle.  In the end a miserable 18th place out of 20 was achieved with 32 points - a distant 34 behind champions Bo'ness. Indeed going into the last league game, Dumbarton were lying in 19th place and favourites to go through the election process for relegation to the Third Division, but an unbelievable 5-0 away win at Ayr would save their Second Division status.

Scottish Cup

Dumbarton reached the second round before losing out to Alloa after a replay.

Dumbartonshire Cup
Dumbarton were again runners-up in the Dumbartonshire Cup.  A fortunate 'toss of the coin' win over Clydebank in the replayed semifinal was followed by a heavy defeat to non-league Helesburgh in the final.

Player statistics

Squad

|}

Source:

Transfers

Players in

Players out 

In addition Francis Carlow, Albert Ferguson, William McDonald, Thomas McKinney, Archibald McNish and Martin Travers all played their last games in Dumbarton 'colours'.

Source:

References

Dumbarton F.C. seasons
Scottish football clubs 1926–27 season